Hoopers Branch is a  long first order tributary to the Reddies River in Wilkes County, North Carolina.  This is the only stream of this name in the United States.

Course
Hoopers Branch rises in North Wilkesboro, North Carolina and then flows southwest to join the Reddies River at about 0.5 miles west of North Wilkesboro.

Watershed
Hooper Branch drains  of area, receives about 51.5 in/year of precipitation, has a wetness index of 307.83, and is about 41% forested.

References

Rivers of North Carolina
Bodies of water of Wilkes County, North Carolina